Oru Kaidhiyin Diary is a 1985 Indian Tamil-language action thriller film directed by Bharathiraja and co-written by K. Bhagyaraj. The film stars Kamal Haasan. It was high financially successful and completed 175 day run in theatres become silver jubilee film. It was remade in Hindi as Aakhree Raasta (1986), directed by Bhagyaraj.

Plot 
David, a prisoner, tries to escape from prison, but is caught and gets his sentence increased multi-fold as a result. He gets released from prison after 22 long years and visits his dear friend Velapan.  The flashback shows that David and Rosy were married and had a happy life.  David is politically active in the grassroots movement and introduces his wife and newborn son to the leader of his party, the powerful politician Suryaprakasam, whom David trusted and for whom he had a high regard. The child is named James, with Suryaprakasam's blessings. However, Suryaprakasam is an evil man and was smitten by Rosy, when he saw her.  He concocts a dastardly plan; he organises a political protest that obstructs oncoming rail traffic with David as the leader, knowing David will get arrested; thereby allowing him access to Rosy.

Suryaprakasam succeeds in his evil plan. Rosy then comes to him for help in getting David released. Suryaprakasam manipulates her child away from her and then attempts to disrobe her, but Rosy escapes.  However, Suryaprakasam was prepared—his sidekick threatens to harm James unless she submits—Rosy was forced to submit and come back—Suryaprakasam then rapes her violently with his henchmen's help. Shamed and humiliated, Rosy then commits suicide by hanging herself and leaves her husband a handwritten note with the details. Meanwhile, Velapan bails out David.  David, who is proud to have gone to jail for Suryaprakasam's protest, comes home singing his praises (with Velapan sobbing as he knows what happened to Rosy), until he sees Rosy hanging dead and reads her note.  Upset, David confronts Suryaprakasam at his birthday function and makes a scene. Inspector Viswanathan and Dr. Unnikrishnan pretend to help David but are actually Suryaprakasam's friends. They successfully manipulate Rosy's note away from David and destroy it, thereby the entire evidence of the crime, laughing all the while at the hapless David.

The trio then frames David for Rosy's murder, lies in court, and easily wins the case. David gets sentenced to prison for killing his wife. He leaves his only son with his close friend Velappan, who promises to raise David's son as a hardened thug, who will help David avenge Rosy's humiliation and death, and David's wrongful imprisonment. Upon release from prison, David sees that Velapan is a changed man, no longer engages in questionable activities, educated David's son, and raised him in a righteous way. David's son James is now called "Shankar" and is a well-respected and courageous police inspector.  David is upset at this news, knows he cannot count on Velapan and his own son, and vows his revenge against the trio who framed him by himself, without anyone's help.

David comes to a church and confesses to the priest that he would kill 3 people, without naming them or himself. The priest informs this to the police, who publish the news in the press and try in vain to capture the unknown would-be killer. David starts his revenge; he tricks his way into Police Headquarters by posing as a priest who knows about the would-be killer and victims, and insists that he will only discuss matters with the now Superintendent (SP) Viswanathan.  He succeeds in entering SP Viswanathan's office, identifies himself, and reminds the SP of his horrific betrayal and at gunpoint makes him call his friend, Dr. Unnikrishnan.  He then sets up a Rube Goldbergian contraption—a hanging trap, tied to the office door. Dr. Unnikrishnan comes to the SP's office as planned; when he opens the door, SP Viswantahan is hanged and kicks out in the throes of death, watched by the aghast Dr. Unni Krishnan.  David then escapes from the pursuing police led by Inspector Shankar. Unfortunately, David left clues in a tape-recorded conversation at SP Viswanathan's office, and Inspector Shankar investigates and identifies the other two victims as Dr. Unnikrishnan and Suryaprakasam. Undaunted, David then kills Dr. Unnikrishnan, too, with a telescopic rifle, despite strong police protection, and escapes again. David is supported by Sharadha, the love of Shankar, who knows about and sympathises with his revenge and wife's rape. The climax shows David killing his last target, Suryaprakasam, and how Shankar has to do his duty of shooting his father.

Cast 
Kamal Haasan as David and James alias Shankar
Radha as Rosy
Revathi as Sharadha
Janagaraj as Velappan
Malaysia Vasudevan as Suryaprakasam the Politician
Vijayan as Dr. Unnikrishnan
Vinu Chakravarthy – Inspector and S. P. Viswanathan

Production 
Kamal Haasan and Bharathiraja initially began production on a film titled Top Takkar. After  was canned, the film was shelved as Bharathiraja felt it was becoming too similar to his and Haasan's earlier film Sigappu Rojakkal (1978), and decided to collaborate with Haasan on a different film, which eventually became Oru Kaidhiyin Diary; K. Bhagyaraj developed the story, which Bharathiraja expanded into a screenplay. The makeup for Haasan was provided by Michael Westmore.

Soundtrack 
The music was composed by Ilaiyaraaja with lyrics by Vairamuthu. The song "ABC Nee Vasi" is based on "L'Arlesienne" by Georges Bizet, and is set to the Carnatic raga known as Mohanam. The song "Ponmaane" is set in Sivaranjani raga. For the Telugu-dubbed version Khaidi Veta, all lyrics were written by Rajasri.

Reception 
Jayamanmadhan of Kalki praised the performances of cast and crew and the film can be enjoyed for the hardwork.

Remakes 
Oru Kaidhiyin Diary was remade in Hindi as Aakhree Raasta (1986), directed by Bhagyaraj. Despite having a dubbed version in Telugu titled Khaidi Veta, Oru Kaidhiyin Diary was remade in the same language as Marana Homam (1987).

References

External links 
 

1980s police procedural films
1980s Tamil-language films
1985 action thriller films
1985 films
Fictional portrayals of the Tamil Nadu Police
Films directed by Bharathiraja
Films scored by Ilaiyaraaja
Indian action thriller films
Indian films about revenge
Indian rape and revenge films
Tamil films remade in other languages